The Fashionable Lady is a 1730 comedy play by James Ralph.

It premiered at the Goodman's Fields Theatre in Whitechapel with a cast that included William Giffard as Meanwell, James Lacy as Drama, Thomas Smith as Whim and Anna Marcella Giffard as Mrs Sprightly. The play has been described as "a hyperbolic take-off on The Beggar's Opera."    It was a moderate success and  poked fun at the sorry state of English drama,  uncritical acceptance of Italian opera, and the stupidity of theater managers.

References

Bibliography
 Burling, William J. A Checklist of New Plays and Entertainments on the London Stage, 1700-1737. Fairleigh Dickinson Univ Press, 1992.
 Nicoll, Allardyce. A History of Early Eighteenth Century Drama: 1700-1750. CUP Archive, 1927.

1730 plays
Comedy plays
Plays by James Ralph